Stephan Grossmann (born 2 September 1971) is a German actor. He appeared in more than one hundred films since 1992.

Selected filmography

References

External links 

 Stephan Grossmann at crew-united.com

1971 births
Living people
Actors from Dresden
German male film actors